One hundred and twenty-one grounds have hosted Test cricket since the first officially recognised Test match between Australia and England in Melbourne in March 1877. The grounds are listed in the order in which they were first used as a venue for Test cricket. The list excludes World Series Cricket venues.

On 8 July 2009, Sophia Gardens in Cardiff became the 100th Test venue. The Ekana Cricket Stadium in India became the 121st and most recent Test venue when it staged a match between Afghanistan and West Indies in November 2019.

List of Test cricket grounds
Last updated on 9 March 2023 (Test 2499):

 – 22 Tests from 1896 to 1939; not used for first-class cricket since 1946; redeveloped as Johannesburg Railway Station.
 – Staged only one Test; not used for cricket since 1973; home ground of Sheffield United F.C.
 – 4 Tests from 1910 to 1921; not used for first-class cricket since 1922; demolished.
 – Staged two Tests, one in 1928 and the other in 1931; not used for first-class cricket since 1931.
 – 6 Tests from 1948 to 1954; not used for first-class cricket since 1956; now used only for rugby union.
 – First used by Pakistan for 8 Tests, later for 9 Tests by Bangladesh, including the inaugural home Test for both sides, on 1 January 1955 and 10 November 2000 respectively. Used exclusively for football since March 2005.
 – Staged only one Test in 1992; subsequent Tests in Bulawayo played at the Queens Sports Club.
 – Hosted the first Day-Night Test match on 27 November 2015.

Grounds by country
List of number of grounds by country up to 9 March 2023 (Test 2499):

See also
 List of One Day International cricket grounds
 List of Twenty20 International cricket grounds
 List of women's Test cricket grounds
 List of cricket grounds by capacity

References 
Specific

General

External links 
 Cricinfo – Grounds

Test